Solon Nikitas (October 1, 1937 – October 22, 2005) was a distinguished Cypriot judge and jurist. Born in Limassol on 1.10.1937, where he lived his early years.  His family then moved to Famagusta and he graduated from the Gymnasium of Famagusta with distinction and being awarded the Palamas Prize.  Working for a short time at the Board of Commerce, he then went to England where he studied law and was called to the Bar (Lincoln's).  From 1961 he practiced law in Nicosia. On 10.9.1971 he was appointed Judge of the District Court of Famagusta, subsequently serving at the District Court of Nicosia (from 10.9.1973).  On 10.10.1980 he was appointed Senior District Judge and on 1.1.1982 President of District Court, serving at the District Court of Nicosia and (from 1.9.1987) at the District Court of Larnaca-Famagusta.  On 19.11.1988 he was appointed Judge of the Supreme Court. He left the Court on 30.4.2003, upon his appointment as Attorney-General.  He resigned from that position in May 2005 in connection with a judgment of the Supreme Court, considering, as he stated in his announcement, that the case “is inextricably interwoven with the very essence of the administration of justice, the principles of the rule of law and the democratic principle of the separation of powers.  It is also related to the existence, the endurance and the quality of institutions in a free and democratic society”.

He was elected as a member of the council of the Commonwealth Magistrates and Judges Association (CMJA) in 1994 and as a Regional Vice-President for the North Atlantic and Mediterranean Region of the CMJA in 1997. As Regional Vice-President he organised the very successful follow-up conference on the Latimer House Principles in Larnaca in October 1988 on "The Role of the Judiciary in Developing and maintaining a vibrant human rights environment in the Commonwealth". He participated in many conferences all over the world and gave lectures and speeches on several legal subjects during his long and distinguished legal and judicial career. Inspired by intense democratic convictions, he was a founding and acting member of the Organisation for the Restoration of Democracy in Greece.

See also
 List of Cypriots
List of prominent jurists

References

1937 births
2005 deaths
20th-century Cypriot judges
21st-century Cypriot judges
Attorneys-General of Cyprus